The Frank–Starling law of the heart (also known as Starling's law and the Frank–Starling mechanism) represents the relationship between stroke volume and end diastolic volume. The law states that the stroke volume of the heart increases in response to an increase in the volume of blood in the ventricles, before contraction (the end diastolic volume), when all other factors remain constant. As a larger volume of blood flows into the ventricle, the blood stretches cardiac muscle, leading to an increase in the force of contraction. The Frank-Starling mechanism allows the cardiac output to be synchronized with the venous return, arterial blood supply and humoral length, without depending upon external regulation to make alterations. The physiological importance of the mechanism lies mainly in maintaining left and right ventricular output equality.

Physiology

The Frank-Starling mechanism occurs as the result of the length-tension relationship observed in striated muscle, including for example skeletal muscles, arthropod muscle and cardiac (heart) muscle. As striated muscle is stretched, active tension is created by altering the overlap of thick and thin filaments. The greatest isometric active tension is developed when a muscle is at its optimal length. In most relaxed skeletal muscle fibers, passive elastic properties maintain the muscle fibers length near optimal, as determined usually by the fixed distance between the attachment points of tendons to the bones (or the exoskeleton of arthropods) at either end of the muscle. In contrast, the relaxed sarcomere length of cardiac muscle cells, in a resting ventricle, is lower than the optimal length for contraction. There is no bone to fix sarcomere length in the heart (of any animal) so sarcomere length is very variable and depends directly upon blood filling and thereby expanding the heart chambers. In the human heart, maximal force is generated with an initial sarcomere length of 2.2 micrometers, a length which is rarely exceeded in a normal heart. Initial lengths larger or smaller than this optimal value will decrease the force the muscle can achieve. For longer sarcomere lengths, this is the result of there being less overlap of the thin and thick filaments; for shorter sarcomere lengths, the cause is the decreased sensitivity for calcium by the myofilaments. An increase in filling of the ventricle increases the load experienced by each cardiac muscle cells, stretching their sarcomeres toward their optimal length.

The stretching sarcomeres augments cardiac muscle contraction by increasing the calcium sensitivity of the myofibrils, causing a greater number of actin-myosin cross-bridges to form within the muscle. Specifically, the sensitivity of troponin for binding Ca2+ increases and there is an increased release of Ca2+ from the sarcoplasmic reticulum. In addition, stretch of cardiac myocytes increases the releasability of Ca2+ from the internal store, the sarcoplasmic reticulum, as shown by an increase in Ca2+ spark rate upon axial stretch of single cardiac myocytes. Finally, there is thought to be a decrease in the spacing between thick and thin filaments, when a cardiac muscle is stretched, allowing an increased number of cross-bridges to form. The force that any single cardiac muscle cell generates is related to the sarcomere length at the time of muscle cell activation by calcium. The stretch on the individual cell, caused by ventricular filling, determines the sarcomere length of the fibres. Therefore the force (pressure) generated by the cardiac muscle fibres is related to the end-diastolic volume of the left and right ventricles as determined by complexities of the force-sarcomere length relationship.

Due to the intrinsic property of myocardium that is responsible for the Frank-Starling mechanism, the heart can automatically accommodate an increase in venous return, at any heart rate. The mechanism is of functional importance because it serves to adapt left ventricular output to right ventricular output. If this mechanism did not exist and the right and left cardiac outputs were not equivalent, blood would accumulate in the pulmonary circulation (were the right ventricle producing more output than the left) or the systemic circulation (were the left ventricle producing more output than the right).

Clinical examples

Premature ventricular contraction 
Premature ventricular contraction causes early emptying of the left ventricle (LV) into the aorta. Since the next ventricular contraction occurs at its regular time, the filling time for the LV increases, causing an increased LV end-diastolic volume. Due to the Frank–Starling mechanism, the next ventricular contraction is more forceful, leading to the ejection of the larger than normal volume of blood, and bringing the LV end-systolic volume back to baseline.

Diastolic dysfunction – heart failure 
Diastolic dysfunction is associated with a reduced compliance, or increased stiffness, of the ventricle wall. This reduced compliance results in an inadequate filling of the ventricle and a decrease in the end-diastolic volume. The decreased end-diastolic volume then leads to a reduction in stroke volume because of the Frank-Starling mechanism.

History
The Frank–Starling law is named after the two physiologists, Otto Frank and Ernest Henry Starling. However, neither Frank nor Starling was the first to describe the relationship between the end-diastolic volume and the regulation of cardiac output. The first formulation of the law was theorized by the Italian physiologist Dario Maestrini, who on December 13, 1914, started the first of 19 experiments that led him to formulate the "legge del cuore" .

Otto Frank's contributions are derived from his 1895 experiments on frog hearts. In order to relate the work of the heart to skeletal muscle mechanics, Frank observed changes in diastolic pressure with varying volumes of the frog ventricle. His data was analyzed on a pressure-volume diagram, which resulted in his description of peak isovolumic pressure and its effects on ventricular volume.

Starling experimented on intact mammalian hearts, such as from dogs, to understand why variations in arterial pressure, heart rate, and temperature do not affect the relatively constant cardiac output. More than 30 years before the development of the sliding filament model of muscle contraction and the understanding of the relationship between active tension and sarcomere length, Starling hypothesized in 1914, "the mechanical energy set free in the passage from the resting to the active state is a function of the length of the fiber." Starling used a volume-pressure diagram to construct a length-tension diagram from his data. Starling's data and associated diagrams, provided evidence that the length of the muscle fibers, and resulting tension, altered the systolic pressure.

See also
 Starling equation

References

Cardiovascular physiology
Mathematics in medicine